The  is a 26.8 km Japanese railway line operated by the private railway operator Nagoya Railroad (Meitetsu), which connects Biwajima Junction in Kiyosu, Aichi with Shin-Unuma Station in Kakamigahara, Gifu. Together with the Kakamigahara Line, the line forms an alternate route of the Nagoya Main Line between Higashi-Biwajima and Meitetsu Gifu.

Stations 
●  (L)
●  (S)
●  (E)
●  (R)
●  (LE)
●  (RL)
●  (MU)

All trains stop at stations marked "●" and pass stations marked "|". Some trains stop at "▲".

History

The Nagoya Electric Railway (later Meitetsu) opened the Biwajima to Iwakura section, as an interurban electrified at 600 V DC, in 1910. The line was extended to Inuyama in 1912 built with double tracks. In 1922, the Biwajima to Iwakura section was double-tracked, and in 1926, the line was extended as dual track to Shin-Unuma, including a combined rail and road bridge over the Kisogawa.

In 1948, the voltage was increased to 1,500 V DC, and in 1993 through services commenced on the Nagoya Subway Tsurumai Line. The road utilising the Kisogawa rail bridge was diverted onto its own bridge in 2000, ending the last such combined bridge usage in Japan.

Former connecting lines
 Iwakura Station: The Nagoya Electric Railway opened a 7 km line electrified at 600 V DC to Ichinomiya on the Main line in 1913. The voltage on the line was increased to 1,500 V DC in 1948, and the line closed in 1965. The company opened a 6 km line electrified at 600 V DC to Komaki on the Komaki line in 1920. The voltage on the line was increased to 1,500 V DC in 1955, and the line closed in 1964.

References

Inuyama Line
Rail transport in Aichi Prefecture
Rail transport in Gifu Prefecture
Railway lines opened in 1910
1067 mm gauge railways in Japan